Vincenza Beatrice Speraz (1843 in Trieste – 4 December 1923 in Milan), known by her literary pseudonym Bruno Sperani, was an Italian writer, best remembered for her novels Cesare (1879), L'avvocato Malpieri  (1888), Maddalena (1892), Emma Walder (1893), and The Lady of the Regina (1910).

References 

1843 births
1923 deaths
Italian writers